Klubi i Basketbollit Bashkimi, also known as K.B. Bashkimi or simply Bashkimi , is a professional basketball team based in Prizren, Kosovo. Bashkimi is the oldest basketball team in Kosovo and competes in the top professional men's basketball league in Kosovo, IP Superliga, since 1991.

History
Klubi i Basketbollit Bashkimi was founded in 1945 in Prizren. It is the oldest basketball team in Kosovo, and one of the oldest in the Balkans. It has traditionally been the most representative sports team of the city of Prizren. Initially competing in the ex-Yugoslavian competitions, Bashkimi was to join the first season of the Kosovo Basketball League. 2014/15 was the first time Bashkimi participated in an international competition, when the team joined the regional Balkan League.

Honours
Kosovo Basketball Superleague:
Winners (1): 2017/18
Runners-up (2): 2008/09, 2016/17

Kosovo Cup:
Winners (1): 2000/01
Runners-up (6): 2001/02, 2002/03, 2011/12, 2013/14, 2017/18, 2021/22

Balkan League:
Runners-up (1): 2017/18

Fan club
The team`s fan club are called Arpagijkt.

Current roster

Depth chart

Coaching history

  Jeton Nixha (2008–2010)
  Dervish Agaj (2010–2011)
  Naser Oskaček (2011–2012)
  Edin Kërveshi (2012–2014)
  Miodrag Baletić (2014–2015)
  Petar Mijović (2015–2016)
  Dragan Radović (2016–2017)
  Predrag Milović (2017)
 Fotis Takianos (2017)
 Stratos Koukolekidis (2018)
 Dragan Radović (2018)
  Krunoslav Krajnović (2018-2019)
  Jeronimo Šarin (2019)
 Illmen Bajra (2019-2021)
 Franko Sterle (2021)
 Branimir Pavic (2021-2022)
 Darko Radulovic (2022-present)

Notable players

 Davor Pejčinović
 William Njoku
 Johny Philips
 Justin Black 
 Lee Benson
 Schin Kerr
 Vedran Bosnic, 
 Billy Armstrong, 
 Bledar Gjeqaj,

External links
Team profile at Eurobasket.com

Sport in Prizren
Basketball teams established in 1945
Basketball teams in Yugoslavia
Basketball teams in Kosovo